The  is the 22nd edition of the Japan Film Professional Awards. It awarded the best of 2012 in film. The ceremony took place on June 15, 2013 at Theatre Shinjuku in Tokyo.

Awards 
Best Film: SR Saitama no Rappā Road Side no Tōbōsha
Best Director: Kōji Wakamatsu (11:25 The Day He Chose His Own Fate, Kaien Hotel Blue)
Best Actress: Atsuko Maeda (Kueki Ressha)
Best Actor: Arata Iura (11:25 The Day He Chose His Own Fate, Our Homeland)
Best New Director: Shō Miyake (Playback)
Best New Producer: Saki Sugino (Odayakana Nichijō)
Special: Ginza Cinepathos (Theatre closed in March 2013.)
Special: Naoko Otani (For Land of Hope and her longtime work.)

10 best films
 SR Saitama no Rappā Road Side no Tōbōsha (Yu Irie)
 Beyond Outrage (Takeshi Kitano)
 Ai to Makoto (Takashi Miike)
 Odayakana Nichijō (Nobuteru Uchida)
 Like Someone in Love (Abbas Kiarostami)
 Himizu (Sion Sono)
 Ōgon o Daite Tobe (Kazuyuki Izutsu)
 11:25 The Day He Chose His Own Fate (Kōji Wakamatsu)
 Kono Sora no Hana Nagaoka Hanabi Monogatari (Nobuhiko Obayashi)
 Wolf Children (Mamoru Hosoda)

References

External links
  

Japan Film Professional Awards
2013 in Japanese cinema
Japan Film Professional Awards
June 2013 events in Japan
Japan Film Professional Awards